Żukowice may refer to the following places in Poland:
Żukowice, Lower Silesian Voivodeship (south-west Poland)
Żukowice, Świętokrzyskie Voivodeship (south-central Poland)
 Gmina Żukowice
Żukowice, Głogów